"Make Me an Island" is a 1969 hit song by Irish pop singer Joe Dolan, written by Albert Hammond and Mike Hazlewood. The lyric begins "Different eyes, different size, different girls every day". The song topped the charts in 14 countries worldwide, and peaked at Number 2 in Ireland and Number 3 in the UK. In the US, Tom Northcott released a competing version of the song on Warner Bros.-Seven Arts Records.

Charts

Cover versions 

Karel Gott - "Poslouchej Amore" (Make Me An Island)

References 

1969 songs
Joe Dolan songs
Songs written by Albert Hammond
Songs written by Mike Hazlewood
Warner Records singles
1969 singles